There have been 46 players selected in the National Football League supplemental draft since its inception in 1977. The supplemental draft was enacted in 1977 for players who had various circumstances affect their eligibility and did not enter the main NFL draft. The only player selected in the supplemental draft to enter the Pro Football Hall of Fame was Cris Carter, who was selected in 1987 and elected to the Hall of Fame in 2013. In addition, there have been eight players selected to Pro Bowls in their careers: Bernie Kosar (drafted in 1985), Cris Carter (1987), Bobby Humphrey (1989), Rob Moore (1990), Mike Wahle (1998), Jamal Williams (1998), Ahmad Brooks (2006), and Josh Gordon (2012).

In 1984, the National Football League held a supplemental draft for college seniors who had already signed with either the United States Football League or the Canadian Football League. On June 5 in New York City, the draft was completed in an attempt to head off a bidding war in its own ranks for USFL and CFL players. Three players in this draft entered the Pro Football Hall of Fame: Steve Young, Gary Zimmerman, and Reggie White.

List

Notes

References

National Football League Draft